Dewang Mehta (10 August 1962 – 12 April 2001) was the president of NASSCOM between 1991 and 2001. In addition to his role at NASSCOM, he was appointed in 1998 to an IT and Software Development task force, and was also involved in various advisory bodies.

Personal life
Mehta was born in Umreth, Gujarat and studied at Imperial College London  He died from a heart attack on 12 April 2001 while serving on an IT TaskForce delegation visit to Sydney. The Dewang Mehta Foundation (DMFT) was created in 2002.

Recognitions 
Mehta was named "Software Evangelist of the Year" by Computerworld for 3 consecutive years and "IT Man of the Year" in 2000. In the same year, the World Economic Forum chose Mehta as one of the 100 "Global leaders of Tomorrow".

References

External links 
 Official website
 Dewang Mehta Foundation

2001 deaths
People from Anand district
1962 births
People in information technology
Alumni of Imperial College London